The  is an electric multiple unit (EMU) commuter train type operated by the private railway operator Keihan Electric Railway in Kyoto, Japan, since 2002.

Design

Operations
Since 2007, the 10000 series sets are primarily used on Keihan Katano Line driver-only operation services.

Formations
, the fleet consists of six four-car sets formed as follows, with two motored cab ("Mc") cars at the ends, and two non-powered trailer ("T") cars in the middle.

4-car sets

 "Mc" cars are motored driving cars (with driving cabs).
 "T" cars are unpowered trailer cars.
 The Mc cars each have one scissors-type pantograph.

7-car trainsets

Set 10001, reformed as a seven-car set in 2016, is formed as follows.

Car 10701 was renumbered from 9000 series car 9601, car 10101 was renumbered from former 7200 series car 7301, and 10751 was renumbered from former 9000 series car 9602.

Interior

History

A total of six four-car sets were built, with three sets built in 2002 and three in 2006. From 2009, the fleet was repainted into the new Keihan commuter train livery of dark green and white, with the entire fleet treated by 2010.

In February 2015, set 10001 was reformed as a seven-car set by adding two former 9000 series cars (9601 and 9602 from sets 9001 and 9002 respectively) and a former 7200 series car (7301 of set 7201) made surplus when former eight-car sets were reduced to seven cars in 2015.

References

External links

  

Electric multiple units of Japan
10000 series
Train-related introductions in 2002
Kawasaki multiple units
1500 V DC multiple units of Japan